Hubert Ranjan Costa (born 21 April 1953 in Dhaka) is a Polish politician. Born in Bangladesh, studied in Poland, he was elected to Sejm on 25 September 2005, getting 3521 votes in 1 Legnica district as a candidate from Samoobrona Rzeczpospolitej Polskiej list.

See also
Members of Polish Sejm 2005-2007

External links
Hubert Costa - parliamentary page - includes declarations of interest, voting record, and transcripts of speeches.

1953 births
Living people
People from Dhaka
Members of the Polish Sejm 2005–2007
Self-Defence of the Republic of Poland politicians
St. Gregory's High School and College alumni